A list of people, who died during the 18th century, who have received recognition as Blessed (through beatification) or Saint (through canonization) from the Catholic Church:

See also 

Christianity in the 18th century

18
 Christian saints
18th-century venerated Christians
Lists of 18th-century people